Marij Julij Kogoj (Trieste, 20 September 1892 – Ljubljana, 25 February 1956) was a Slovenian composer. He was a pupil of Schoenberg and Franz Schreker, and immensely popular during the 1920s, culminating with his opera Črne maske (Black masks). His career ended in 1932, when he was institutionalized for schizophrenia. He remained there until his death in 1956.

Works, editions, recordings
 Črne maske "Black masks" Opera 1928 - scheduled for performance January 2012

Recordings
 Complete Works for Violin & Piano, Črtomir Šiškovič (violin) and Emanuele Arciuli. Stradivarius 2000

References

Slovenian composers
Male composers
1890s births
1956 deaths
Musicians from Trieste
People with schizophrenia
20th-century composers
Slovenian male musicians